Agenor de Miranda Araújo Neto, better known as Cazuza (April 4, 1958 – July 7, 1990), was a Brazilian singer and songwriter, born in Rio de Janeiro. Along with Raul Seixas, Renato Russo and Os Mutantes, Cazuza, both while fronting Barão Vermelho and at solo career, is considered one of the best exponents of Brazilian rock music. In his 9-year career, he sold more than 5 million albums and achieved 11 number one singles and 18 Top 10 singles in Brazil.

Biography

Early life and influences
Son of the record producer João Araújo and the amateur singer Maria Lúcia Araújo, Cazuza always had close contact with music. Influenced since early childhood by the strong values of Brazilian music, he had a special preference for the sad, dramatic overtones of Cartola, Lupicinio Rodrigues, Dolores Duran, and Maysa. He began to write lyrics and poems around 1965. In late 1974, a vacation in London, England, acquainted him with the music of Led Zeppelin, Janis Joplin and The Rolling Stones, and he soon became a great fan. Cazuza enrolled in college in 1978, but abandoned the course of journalism three weeks later to work with his father at Som Livre. He moved later to San Francisco, where he came in contact with Beat literature, becoming highly influenced by it.

Barão Vermelho
In 1980 he returned to Rio, where he worked with the theatrical group Asdrúbal Trouxe o Trombone (Asdrúbal Brought the Trombone). There he was noticed by the novice singer/composer Léo Jaime, who introduced him to a beginning rock band that needed a vocalist, the Barão Vermelho (Red Baron). With this very successful eighties Brazilian rock band, who had their greatest success with "Bete Balanço", a song that was part of the soundtrack of a film, Cazuza began his career as a singer. In 1985, Cazuza took part in Rock in Rio with Barão Vermelho, and around this time, Caetano Veloso claimed he was the greatest Brazilian poet of his generation. It was also in this same year that Cazuza was infected with the AIDS virus, precipitating his desire to leave the band to obtain a greater freedom in composition and expression, both musically and lyrically.

Solo career
After he left the band, Cazuza's music began to diversify, incorporating elements of the blues in songs such as "Blues da Piedade" (Blues of Compassion), "Só as mães são felizes" (Only Mothers Are Happy) and "Balada da Esplanada" (Ballad of the Esplanade), which was based on a poem of the same name by Oswald de Andrade; showcasing increasingly intimate lyrics, like those in "Só se for a Dois" (Only If It Will Be as a Couple), as well as opening itself up to influences from Brazilian pop music with interpretations of Cartola's "O Mundo é um Moinho" (The World is a Windmill), Raul Seixas's "Cavalos Calados" (Silent Horses) and Caetano Veloso's "Esse Cara" (This Guy).

Contrary to what usually happens once an artist leaves a band that has made them famous, Cazuza's solo career proved to be more successful than that of his former group. "Exagerado" (Exaggerated), "O Tempo não Pára" (Time Doesn't Stop), and "Ideologia" (Ideology) were his greatest hits and proved to be a great influence on subsequent Brazilian musicians.

In 1986, Cazuza was featured in the AIDS benefit album Red Hot + Rio produced by the Red Hot Organization, performing the song "Preciso Dizer que Te Amo" in a duet with Bebel Gilberto.

Final years
In 1989, he admitted publicly for the first time that he had AIDS and released his last album in life: Burguesia. Cazuza was openly bisexual but was not active in the LGBT movement. However, his openness about being a person with AIDS helped to change public perceptions and attitudes about HIV/AIDS prevention and treatment.

Death

Cazuza died in Rio de Janeiro on July 7, 1990, at the age of 32, due to a septic shock caused by AIDS. He was buried at the Cemitério São João Batista in Botafogo, Rio de Janeiro. Cazuza's mother set up the Viva Cazuza Society (Sociedade Viva Cazuza), a charity which sponsors AIDS prevention and provides a home for HIV-positive children

Other media
A biopic starring Daniel de Oliveira and directed by Sandra Werneck called Cazuza: O Tempo não Para ("Cazuza: Time Doesn't Stop") was released in 2004.

In 2014, the biographic musical Cazuza – Pro Dia Nascer Feliz opened in São Paulo. It featured songs from Cazuza's solo career as well as from his time as frontman of Barão Vermelho. The musical starring Emílio Dantas was directed by João Fonseca and toured Brazil for two years.

Discography

With Barão Vermelho 
 1982: Barão Vermelho 120,000 – Gold
 1983: Barão Vermelho 2 180,000 – Gold
 1984: Bete Balanço (Original Soundtrack)
 1984: Maior Abandonado 800,000 – Platinum
 1992: Barão Vermelho Ao Vivo

Solo 
 1985: Exagerado 750,000 – Platinum 2x
 1987: Só se for a dois 600,000 – Platinum
 1988: Ideologia 2,000,000 – Diamond
 1988: O tempo não pára 1,800,000 – Diamond
 1989: Burguesia 850,000 – Platinum 2x
 1991: Por aí 600,000 – Platinum
 2005: O Poeta Está Vivo – Ao Vivo no Teatro Ipanema 1987 250,000 – Platinum

Films
Bete Balanço, 1984
Um Trem para as Estrelas, 1988
Cazuza - O Tempo Não Pára, 2004 (biopic)

References

External links

Official site

Biography

1958 births
1990 deaths
AIDS-related deaths in Rio de Janeiro (state)
Deaths from sepsis
Alternative rock singers
Bisexual men
Bisexual singers
Bisexual composers
Bisexual songwriters
Brazilian composers
20th-century Brazilian male singers
Brazilian rock singers
Brazilian socialists
Brazilian LGBT singers
Brazilian LGBT songwriters
Musicians from Rio de Janeiro (city)
20th-century composers
20th-century Brazilian LGBT people
LGBT people in Latin music
Burials at Cemitério de São João Batista
Brazilian bisexual people